Part-Dieu is an area of Lyon Metropolis. It is also the second largest tertiary district in France, after La Défense in Greater Paris, with over 1,150,000 m2 of office and service space, along with 45,000 service sector jobs, 2,500 companies and a 97% occupancy rate. The area contains the Part-Dieu train station.

Located on the Left Bank of the Rhône river, this urban centre also provides major entertainment and cultural facilities, including one of the largest urban shopping malls in Europe, 800 shops, Paul Bocuse indoor food market, café terraces, the Auditorium concert hall, Bourse du Travail theatre, Municipal Library, Departmental Archives and Montluc Fort. Moreover, it harbours Tour Incity (202m), Tour Part-Dieu (164m) and Tour Oxygène (117m), making Lyon one of the few European cities able to display high-rise architecture right next to its historical core.

The CBD is currently undergoing major renovation and construction works, according to a revitalization project totalling €2.5 billion between public and private investments.

Governance 
The current 3rd arrondissement Mayor is environmentalist Véronique Bertrand-Dubois. She works for Lyon Metropolis' permanent commission as an advisor on urban habitat, planning, housing and politics.

SPL Part-Dieu, or La Part-Dieu's publicly owned local development corporation, is used by local authorities as an operational tool. It was created back in 2014 and is governed by a board of administrators, chaired by David Kimelfed, head of Lyon Metropolis. 20 people work on urban, economic, human and resources related problems. They manage, control, promote and coordinate the La Part-Dieu project.

Lyon Metropolis is headquartered in La Part-Dieu district, in a brutalist building from the 1970s, on Garibaldi street. It concentrates hundreds of civil workers and local figures hold regular meetings there. Other authority figures include Police Headquarters inside Montluc Fort since 2007 and Sytral Headquarters (Lyon transportation authority).

Urbanity

Urban and green space

A district of 21,000 inhabitants, La Part-Dieu has developed on both sides of the railway and is mostly made up of high-rise and low-rise architecture. According to La Part-Dieu SPL area, this 3rd arrondissement district is roughly limited by Garibaldi street to the West (Rhône Docks and Place Guichard district), Juliette Récamier to the North (Brotteaux district), Maurice Flandin to the East (La Villette district) and the former La Buire automotive plants to the South (ZAC de La Buire).  The original project was based on La Défense urban planning model.

La Rize river used to run through Part-Dieu but was buried in a sewage system. Nowadays, urban planners aim at preventing urban heat island effects thanks to green spaces. For example, Garibaldi street, once a main urban highway, has been revamped as a part of a green path going from Tête d’Or Park to Sergent Blandan and Gerland Park. La Part-Dieu also offers several plazas (Nelson Mandela, Europe, Du lac, Voltaire and Francfort), several gardens (Jugan, Jacob-Kaplan and Sainte-Marie-Perrin) and a park (Montluc Fort), on top of the centenary plane trees from the former cavalry barracks.

Urban services
4 sports facilities
9 private nurseries
concierge services including dry-cleaning and postal services
primary and business schools
Manufacture des tabacs Lyon 3 Jean Moulin University campus

History

Etymology 
Various theories try to explain the origins of the "Part-Dieu" name (literally "Property of God"). It could either come from the tenacity with which several landlords managed to save pieces of land from Rhône waters or how Guillaume de Fuer named his parcel "Pardeu" by the end of the 12th century. A last theory states that Marc-Antoine Mazenod gave his 140 hectares land to Hôtel-Dieu Public Hospitals after his daughter was saved miraculously and named it "Gift from God".

Farmlands 

Before the 1850s, La Part-Dieu was composed of rural flood-zones. It was ceded by the Mazenod-Servient family to the Hôtel-Dieu de Lyon Public Hospitals in 1737. The embankment of the Rhône river and construction of bridges ( see Bridges of Lyon ) led to the management of flood risk and urbanization of the eastern Rhone bank from 1772 onwards. By the end of the 18th century, La Part-Dieu domain was a large estate bordered by the Brotteaux and Guillotière districts.

Lafayette bridge erected in 1872 accelerated the eastward urbanization process, while cleansed farmlands gave way to wheat production. From 1830 to 1848, the city erected walls to protect itself from foreign invasions. Montluc Fort saw life in 1831. La Part-Dieu, thus becoming a fort, acquired a military function. Because of the administrative, urban and geological complexity of Lyon, rail transport brought multiple train stations to existence. The Part-Dieu one was solely dedicated to freight transport.

Cavalry barracks 

In 1844, Public Hospitals sold their land to the military administration, which built cavalry barracks from 1851 to 1863. However, the process of urbanization was limited by traverse axes and the fact that Lafayette street was the only road connecting La Part-Dieu with Central Lyon. The district was added to Lyon administrative area in 1852. To link the city with Geneva, Gare des Brotteaux was designed by the Chemins de fer de Paris à Lyon et à la Méditerranée company, which led to the dismantling of wall fortifications to make way for railway lines. Meanwhile, the military compound took on the orthogonal footprint of the original farm estate. Many cavalry units were mobilized during World War I.

At the beginning of the 20th century, Édouard Herriot was elected Mayor of Lyon, a dominating French city outside of Paris, thanks to its dynamic industrial and commercial output. Inspired by the French hygiéniste urbanist movement, similar to Haussmann's renovation of Paris, he undertook major works to improve urban and social space. The eastward urban expansion of rail and road networks turned La Part-Dieu marshalling yards into the centre of the metropolitan area. In 1926, a project based on American Downtowns emerged.

Post-war housing 
Following World War II, France's top priorities were to rebuild the housing stock fast, to push for economic development and to favour efficient movements by car. Due to the evolution of warfare, the military compound lost its importance and became part of a massive housing estate project.

In 1960, the French State sold the lands to a private company, SERL, to bring the project to life. The subsequent demolition of existing structures took 5 years. The fact that large estates were owned by state administrations (Public Hospitals, SNCF and the military), allowed for a profound transformation right in the middle of the city.

The program evolved under the mandate of Mayor Pradel, not only by pushing for housing construction but also for encouraging the construction of an administrative centre and private office space to host public services, such as radio and police stations. The winning architectural project abided by the Athens Charter, a rigorous modernist urban planning philosophy developed by Le Corbusier.

It promoted the separation of human and car flow through the use of "above the street" concrete structures, in a La Défense fashion, allowing for car supremacy on the lower street level, while overhead orthogonal architecture standing on reinforced concrete stilts followed the Unité d'habitation principles. Consequently, several buildings were drawn by the hands of Jacques Perrin-Fayolle, Jean Sillan and Jean Zumbrunnen, nonetheless, only a third of the planned structures were constructed.

Directional center 
While the Charles de Gaulle government pushed for the decentralization of France, car-centric urbanism from the Trente Glorieuses fuelled peripherical growth at the expense of city centres. As a result, a management plan was drafted by urbanist Charles Delfante and Jean Zumbrunnen, under the supervision of Mayor Louis Pradel. It included the development of commercial, tertiary and cultural activities, to compete with Paris and other international cities and to turn La Part-Dieu into a showcase of modernity. A central train station was planned but the SNCF refused to fund it, a move which hindered the purpose of the directional center.

Lyon had to become the "Balancing Metropolis", relying on regional cities like Grenoble or Saint Etienne, that fought the impoverishment and depopulation of urban centers, owing to a network of highways passing through La Part-Dieu. The original plan included major east–west and north–south green axes, pedestrian-friendly spaces such as a central plaza well served by public transit, and an iconic tower as tall as the Basilica of Notre-Dame de Fourvière from its historical hill.

However, the 1970s oil shocks and following housing crises altered the project as profitability became the main concern, isolating the district from the rest of city flows. Pedestrians were alienated because of the rupture of major axes caused by the expansion of the central mall, and also by favouring vehicle transport over public transit and finally by constructing concrete pedestrian bridges several meters above street level that isolated architectures into islands. Nevertheless, several iconic structures were elevated during this decade, such as the Municipal Library (1972), the Mall and Auditorium (1975) and Tour Part-Dieu (1977). To that end, La Part-Dieu differentiated itself from the historical center with a strong architectural identity by offering high end tertiary activities and public services.

Major rail node 
In 1974, it was decided to transfer the old Brotteaux station to La Part-Dieu thanks to its central position. By that time, Line  of Lyon Métro arrived inside the Mall in 1978. Half of the marshalling yards were converted into a large real estate project to fund the development of the new train station on each side of the rail tracks. The objective was also to integrate the district with its railways, that is, Central Lyon with eastern neighborhoods. 1983 saw the inauguration of France's first high speed rail TGV line, between Lyon and Paris. However, large urban roads surrounding the business district such as Viver-Merle Boulevard, kept the business district isolated from Central Lyon and the train station.

European business district 
La Part-Dieu's expansion slowed down during the 1990s because of a strong momentum of urban development all over the agglomeration, regarding the Confluence district, the Cité Internationale, Gerland and La Doua Campus. The City Council drove efforts to minimize car travel and to encourage public transit within city limits. It also wished to establish a proper European business district doubling its office supply by densifying the area with 7 highrises such as the Swiss Life and Oxygène Tower, although most proposals were scrapped, because Lyon was focusing elsewhere. 

Other objectives aimed at reintegrating the district within its surrounding urban environment by rethinking major axes, bringing the T1 tramway to life, renovating public spaces, improving connections between the métro and the main train station and demolishing elevated pedestrian footbridges.

Economy

Regional and urban context 
Auvergne-Rhône-Alpes region, with a GDP of 250 billion euros, is the second French and fourth European region in terms of GDP : 70,000 companies are created there each year. It is the first industrial French region (with 500,000 industrial jobs on 50,000 sites) and second only in terms of exports (imports amount to 11.2% and exports to 12.4% of France's global exchanges). Chemicals are the main export sector.

According to a 2018 study of Globalization and World Cities Research Network (GaWC), Lyon is a Beta- city, meaning that it's an important globalized city, instrumental in linking their region or state into the world economy. It is also a credible alternative to Paris, with a GDP of 74.6 billion euros and France's second business park.

Economic landscape 
Over half of La Part-Dieu's economic landscape is dedicated to sustainable city and smart systems, showing a 16 percent growth between 2008 and 2013 and now representing more than 30,000 jobs from 45,000 tertiary jobs from 60,000 total jobs inside the district.

It's mostly composed of city infrastructure and urban services (18,000 jobs)
City and building construction (Bouygues, Icade, Foncia, Lyon Metropolis, Préfecture du Rhône, Nexity)
Energy (EDF, GRDF, SPIE, Energy Pool, Vinci, Dalkia)
Transport and mobility (SNCF, Keolis, XPOLogistics, Axxès, Clasqui)
Other public services (INSEE, La Poste, Police Headquarters)
And engineering and digital systems (11,500 jobs)
Information and digital technology (DCS Easywear, Intitek, Orange, Bouygues Telecom, Euriware, RFI)
Tertiary functions of the industrial sector (Areva, Elkem Silicones, Solvay)
Engineering service provider (Egis, Setec, Tractebel, engineering GDF Suez, Artelia, Davidson, Burgeap)
The rest is composed of traditional business and support services (11,500 jobs)
Financial activities (Caisse d'Épargne, BNP Paribas, Agence France Locale, Caisse des impôts, Société Générale, Natixis, BPI France, Banque Populaire)
Audit, consulting, juridical advisory and high value added services (Ernst&Young, Adamas, ManPower, Randstad, Amaris)
Life and non-life insurance (AXA, Klesia, MAAF, April, MMA, Swiss Life)

La Part-Dieu hosts national and regional headquarters of banks (Caisse d’Épargne, Banque Populaire, Banque Rhône Alpes, Société Générale, etc.), national and regional headquarters of leading consultancy firms (EY, Mc Kinsey, Adamas, and Manpower) and global headquarters of international groups (April Group and Elkem Silicones).

Key Figures 

1 150 000 m2 of office space
a flexible offer of 50 to 50,000 m2
rents from €120 to €320 per m2
97% occupancy rate
2500 companies
2000 hotel rooms and residences from one to four stars
20 places for seminars and reunions
8 business centres
available fibre optic network

Landmarks

Sole skyscraper and high-rises 

The skyline is being shaped according to the Alps mountain range.

Tour UAP, built in 1974 at 75 m, was demolished in 2014 to make way for the Incity Tower.

Tour Incity 
Tour Incity, Lyon's tallest structure, was designed by Valode & Pistre and AIA architects. The spire reaches 202 meters and was installed by helicopter. Around 2,700 employees work on 32 floors and share the same corporate restaurant. On the top of that, Tour Incity was the first tower in Lyon to obtain the low energy-consumption label, along with HQE and BREEAM Excellent labels. It was completed in 2016 and currently hosts regional Caisse d'Épargne bank headquarters and several SNCF branches.

Tour Part-Dieu 
Completed in 1977, this 164 meters tall building was designed by US-based architecture firm Cossutta & Associates for the main structure and by Stéphane du Château for its pyramid crown. Mainly occupied by office space, it also hosts a four-star Radisson Blu Hotel at the top. Originally named Crédit Lyonnais, it is now called Tour Part-Dieu, but is best known by its nickname, le Crayon or the Pencil. Its postmodern style is showing through the terracotta cladding made up of pozzolanic sands, imitating the reddish Lyon tiles, and also through the main volume echoing with the Rose Tower traboule in the Vieux Lyon quarter from French Renaissance.

Tour Oxygène 
Tour Oxygène is a 117-meter tall high-rise crowned by a leaf resonating with the district's tradition of crowning high-rises, such as Tour Part-Dieu. Its base serves as an extension and as a direct link to the Part-Dieu Mall, along with an underground parking lot. Designed by Arte Charpentier Architects and constructed in 2010, Tour Oxygène reflects the dynamism that Lyon has been experiencing since the early 2000s.

Tour Swiss life 

Tour Swiss Life was designed by Christian Batton and Robert Roustit and completed in 1989. It reaches 82 meters and holds many Swiss Life office spaces. The whole architecture is surrounded by moats and is covered by typical late 80s and early 90s blue cladding. The company launched a project of a 220-meter skyscraper called Swiss Life 2 (formerly Eva), on the existing parking lot.

Other landmarks

Railway Station 
Originally planned during the 1960s, Part-Dieu railway station only opened in 1983 as part of a high speed rail line project between Lyon and Paris. It was designed by Charles Delfante, Michel Macary,  Eugène Gachon and Jean-Louis Girodet, and serves as a link between Lyon and Villeurbanne, as its design allows pedestrian traffic under concrete rail viaducts. Currently saturated, it is undergoing major renovation and construction works, since it welcomes 120 000 travellers and up to 150 high-speed "TGV" trains per day.

Halles de Lyon Paul Bocuse 
La Part-Dieu covered food market is an international reference in terms of French and Lyon cuisine. 48 merchants ( fishmongers, cheesemakers, bakers and pastry cooks, caterers, cellarmen and restaurant owners ) work under the same roof and perpetuate local traditions of Lyon, the gastronomical capital of France. In 1859, the city inaugurated its first indoor food market with a 19th Century glass and cast-iron architecture in Cordeliers, easing the lives of merchants and consumers, and then decided to innovate the architectural design in the future La Part-Dieu district. Thus in 1971 the new covered market opened. Three decades later, the Halles were put in line with safety standards. It now bears the name of Paul Bocuse, the famed starred French chef from Lyon. Around 600,000 people visited Les Halles during the 2015 Festival of Lights weekend.

Mall 
La Part-Dieu mall was the largest urban mall in Europe when it opened in 1975. Built on the cavalry barracks' former location, it references the past with a parking lot named Cuirassiers or "Light Cavalry". The shopping centre has 240 shops and restaurants over five levels and is frequented by 35 million visitors a year. It also has a 14 screen multiplex cinema. Mass transportation reinforced its position as a regional shopping hub. In 2010 the mall got a major extension thanks to the Oxygène Tower. This Unibail-Rodamco owned project is currently undergoing a major renovation project, totalling 300 million euros, according to a Winy Maas design.

Auditorium Maurice Ravel 
This concrete shell was named after the famed Lyon musician and was drawn by architect Henri Pottier, assistant of urbanist Charles Delfante. Even though the new auditorium offered a great Roman theatre design, it lacked a decent acoustic one. However, several renovations fixed the sound issue. It currently hosts the Orchestre National de Lyon and a substantial organ from the former Trocadéro Palace for the 1878 Exposition Universelle.

Bourse du Travail theatre 
Bourse du Travail theatre was constructed between 1929 and 1936 in Art Deco style by Charles Meysson, chief architect of Lyon. The building facade is covered by a large mosaic from 1934, by the hand of 35 mosaists, according to a work from painter Fernand Fargeot, representing "the city embellished by labour" hence its name "Labour Exchange" or "Bourse du Travail". Interiors are covered by plaster and painted murals inspired by socialist realism.

Municipal Library 
In July 1966, Mayor Louis Pradel decided to experiment the library of the future inside the Part-Dieu project. 27,000 square meters are distributed into 3 levels, each dedicated to public reading, studies and research, while a silo contains all historical documents from the former library. The library is opened to university researchers and middle school students alike. The 1980s saw the mass informatization of data. Users had to wait until the late 2000s to get an entrance opened towards the train station plaza. The structure is currently undergoing renovation.

City and Departmental Archives 
This institution was created after the French Revolution in Lyon. Documentation from the Ancien Régime period used to be stored inside Hôtel de Ville vaults until it was all regrouped inside a 2014 site that opened in La Part-Dieu. It was drawn by Dumetier-design, Gautier-Conquet and Séquences. The consultation room of this golden-clad secure building currently hosts a large collection of maps, both public administrative and private reserves, notarial archives and documents from the historical library, from the year 861 till today.

Lyon Metropolis headquarters 
Lyon Metropolis headquarters were built between 1976 and 1978 by René Gimbert Jacques Vergély in a brutalist style. Four massive square-shaped pier foundations bear the whole suspended structure, doubling as elevator shafts, and four concrete boxes self intersecting on top of it form a crown. Mirror-like curtain walls reflect the surrounding urban environment.

Montluc Fort and Prison museum 

Montluc Fort was erected in 1831 under Louis-Philippe's reign as part of Lyon's fortified belt, to protect the city from foreign invasions, especially Prussian ones. Montluc prison opened in 1926 from the existing fort. Under the Vichy Regime, it became a major Jewish deportation center and French Resistance prison. Jean Moulin and Marc Bloch were imprisoned there. It was later converted into a civilian prison in 1947 and into a museum in 2010.

Church of Blessed "Saint" Sacrement  

Inaugurated in 1905, Blessed "Saint" Sacrament Church combines Gothic and Byzantine styles. Its architecture and unfinished bell tower were drawn by Louis Sainte-Marie-Perrin, architect of Basilica of Notre-Dame de Fourvière. The church was originally designed to preach Christian values in an immoral working-class neighbourhood with a high poverty rate and a low number of baptizations. It has recently being added to a catholic school by AFAA architecture firm.

Garibaldi swimming pool 
Garibaldi swimming pool became the first indoor and public swimming pool in Lyon when it opened in 1933. Designed by architect C.Colliard and engineer Camille Chalumeau in a typical Art Deco style, it was only built in a matter of months.

Transportation 

La Part-Dieu is the main Lyon transportation hub that includes :

a high speed, regional, national, international and freight train station currently saturated and undergoing renovation, that offers:
regional TER rail lines to Grenoble, Saint-Étienne, Clermont-Ferrand, Valence, Roanne, Bourg-en-Bresse, Chambéry and Annecy
national TER and TGV lines to major French city centres such as Paris, Bordeaux, Toulouse, Marseille, Lille and Strasbourg.
international high speed TGV rail lines to major European city centres such as Monaco and Brussels (SNCF), London (Eurostar), Geneva (Lyria), Barcelona (Thalys), Frankfurt (ICE) and Turin and Milan (Trenitalia), between 2 and 6 hours
Lyon-Saint-Exupéry International Airport and high speed rail station, in less than 30 minutes, thanks to a Rhônexpress tramway, with flights to more than 120 international destinations.
line  of Lyon Métro
tramway lines (T1, T3 and T4)
local bus lines (C1, C2, C3, C7, C 13, 25, 37, 38 and 70)
regional bus lines to Isère (1920, 1980 and 2060) or the Rhône region (165)
a main coach station on Francfort Plaza
public bicycle sharing stations
some taxi and drop-off zones
a car rental parking lot
four large public car parks
main Lyon arteries (Cours Lafayette, Garibaldi street, Cours Gambetta, Thiers avenue and Vivier-Merle Boulevard)
4 tunnels easing urban flows and undergoing renovation (Vivier-Merle, Bonnel, Brotteaux and Servient)
major European and National highways, including A6, A7 and E15 "autoroutes" highways near Perrache and Lyon ring roads, in less than 20 minutes.
Central Lyon (historical peninsula) by public transit, car or bike, in less than 10 minutes.

Education 
La Part-Dieu hosts several private education schools, in particular the ISG and MBway Business Schools, as well as the IPSA (aeronautics and aerospace) and Sup'Biotech (biotechnologies) Engineering colleges.

La Part-Dieu 2030

Presentation of the project
Since the 2010s, La Part-Dieu has been undergoing a major transformation, after Lyon Metropolis launched an ambitious project in 2014 to renew the district thanks to a collaboration between La Part-Dieu Publicly-Owned Local development corporation (SPL) and the AUC architecture firm. The whole project is
totalling around €2.5 billion between public and private investments.

Main objectives
La Part-Dieu 2030 project aims at preserving the district's architectural heritage and upgrading it for the 21st century. Modernization will satisfy current office space markets and spur economic development. Better integrated into the urban fabric and transit system, and with a strong focus on designing pleasurable residential and public spaces, the project promotes the contemporary French way of life, on a European level.
Main objectives consist of :

restoring and preserving the 20th century architectural heritage by forcing all new developments, including Tour Incity, to rhyme with the historical context and follow the distinct La Part-Dieu style, that consists mostly of repetitive, retrofuturistic and mineral patterns from the 1960s and 1970s.
offering an increased and contemporary tertiary market by renovating old buildings and constructing a wider variety of facilities of improved tertiary, residential and collective spaces, that contribute to economic drive.
strengthening its role as a transit hub and entrance to the Metropolis, by offloading the railway station through a larger and more suitable design and by rendering the city more pedestrian-friendly through new public spaces and optimized means of transport.
creating a living district promoting the French way of life by introducing ground floor shops and services along roads with significant pedestrian flow and by encouraging leisure activities, cultural and sporting events for adults and children, every day of the week at any time.

Completed projects
Office space
Tour Incity
Silex 1
Sky56
The 107
Deruelle
Aprilium 2
Velum
Equinoxe
Terralta
Le Rephael
Carsat
Edison
Green
Crystallin
Cultural space
City and Department Archives (see landmarks)
Halles Paul Bocuse Carpark
Saint-Sacrement school
Residential space
Bricks
Sky Avenue
Brottier residence
Infrastructure
Garibaldi street
Place de Francfort
New car rental parking lot

Work in progress
Multimodal Transport Hub
a railway station twice as large
L track addition
a new platform access route from Pompidou Avenue
a new Béraudier front gallery with commercial space and ticketing services directly connected to To-Lyon high-rise
a pedestrian area on Place Béraudier along with an underground transit hub aligned with shops, metro access and 1,500 bike spaces. Drop-off and parking lot zones will be located underneath it, next to a tunnel extension.
Buildings under construction
Tour To-Lyon will be an office, four-star hotel and services tower providing conference and trade shows, located beside the railway station and Béraudier Plaza, to be completed around 2023 by Dominique Perrault Architecture (170 m). It is currently under preparation, as hotels currently on site have been demolished.
La Part-Dieu shopping centre is undergoing renovations according to a design by Winy Maas. Stated changes include the addition of large staircases to act as street extensions over the rooftop, which will be transformed into a green public space and offer views over the city. 1970s concrete-shell patterns will be repurposed over glass entrances and allow natural light to radiate inside the modernized interior spaces. More shops will be added.
Silex2 is a contemporary 129-meter-tall extension crowned by a spire, leaned against an 80-meter-tall brutalist high-rise from the 1970s. It is part of La Part-Dieu's modernization plan, since Tour EDF will be repurposed. Má Architects designed these larger office floorspaces to satisfy office space demand, and will deliver them by 2020.
Émergence Lafayette residential high-rise
Orange Campus office headquarters
Urban works
Nelson Mandela plaza extension
Vivier-Merle Boulevard transformation
Underground air-cooling facility to power air-conditioning systems

Future developments
Bouchut street beautification and extension.

Proposed projects
Skyscraper projects :
Swiss Life 2 launched by Swiss Life, possibly by 2025 (200m).
Tour M + M launched by DCB International and designed by Kohn Pedersen Fox, possibly by 2030 (215m).
Milan Plaza (according to the AUC plan) includes several residential high-rises around Place de Milan (200m).
High-rise projects :
Sou Fujimoto Atelier, Dream Paris and EXNDO have proposed a 50m high-rise design with office and residential space, street-level shops and green rooftops, in lieu of the former Caisse d'Épargne headquarters, thanks to its reused materials, right next to Tour Oxygène.
Infrastructure projects :
Métro E line extension to La Part-Dieu
Greater Lyon rail bypass (CFAL) to alievate pressure on La Part-Dieu's rail node
Underground railway station

Key figures
Between 400 and 600 planted trees in public spaces by 2022
30 hectares of public spaces and roads created or developed
200,000 m2 of added equipped spaces dedicated to services, trade, leisure and hotel industries
A railway station twice as large
2,500 new bike spaces
2,200 housing units added
40,000 jobs added
200,000 m2 of added or renovated office space in high-rises or low-rises
A flexible office space market, ranging from 50 to 50,000 m2
A vacancy rate below 3%, 250,000 m2 of which are used or agreed
650,000 m2 of added office space, bringing the total office space to 1,650,000 m2

Further reading
Richard, Damien (2019). La Part-Dieu : 800 ans d'histoire.
Vauzeilles, Georges (2016). La Part-Dieu : l'art urbain de l'aménageur. L'Harmattan.

Desveaux, Delphine (2015). Lyon Part-Dieu : Un coeur métropolitain réinventé. Archibooks.

Kovatchevitch, Claude and Tanhia, Guillaume (2011). La Part-Dieu a-t-elle une âme ?. EMCC.

Delfante, Charles (2009). La Part-Dieu : le succès d'un échec. Libel.

Pelletier, Jean (2000). Le 3e arrondissement de Lyon – De la Guillotière à la Part-Dieu, de Montchat à Monplaisir. ELAH.

See also 
 Central Business District
 List of tallest buildings in France
 Lyon Metropolis
 Lyon Métro
 Lyon tramway
 Lyon Fortified Belts
 Lyon
 3rd arrondissement of Lyon
 Lyon-Part-Dieu Railway Station
 Tour Incity
 Tour Part-Dieu
 Auditorium Maurice Ravel
 Bourse du Travail Theatre
Lyon Part-Dieu Shopping Centre
 Montluc Fort

References 

3rd arrondissement of Lyon
Financial districts in France
Economy of Auvergne-Rhône-Alpes
Quarters of Lyon